Arno H. Denecke (May 7, 1916 – October 20, 1993) was an American jurist born in Illinois. He served on the Oregon Supreme Court from 1963 to 1982, and as the 37th Chief Justice of the court from 1976 until leaving the bench. The World War II veteran retired from the United States Army at the rank of colonel in 1974.

Early life
Denecke was born May 7, 1916, in Rock Island, Illinois. This small city lies on the border of Iowa. In 1939, he graduated from the University of Illinois College of Law with his law degree. He then went to work with Chicago based Montgomery Wards from 1939 to 1941 in both Chicago and Oakland, California.

Then with the outbreak of World War II, Denecke joined the Army and served with the 70th Infantry Division from 1941 to 1945. After the war he served in the Army Reserve. He retired as a colonel after 28 years in 1974. In 1945, Arno was married to Selma Jane Rockey, of Portland, Oregon. They had five children, Ginger, David, Will, John, and Anne.

Legal career
After the war, Denecke moved to Portland, Oregon, and joined the firm of Mautz, Souther, Spaulding, Denecke & Kinsey in 1947. The firm is now known as Schwabe, Williamson, Wyatt. While in private practice Denecke argued in front of the U.S. Supreme Court as attorney for Ross Island Sand & Gravel in a worker's compensation case, Hahn v. Ross Island Sand & Gravel Co., 358 U.S. 272 (1959). During this time he served as a member of the Portland School Board in the 1950s. Denecke left the firm in 1959 when he was appointed as circuit court judge for Multnomah County by Governor Mark Hatfield.

In 1983 he was a member of the American Bar Association Commission on Evaluation of Professional Standards that drafted the Model Rules of Professional Conduct. As an educator Arno Denecke taught at the University of Oregon School of Law, Northwestern School of Law, Army Judge Advocate General School, and Willamette University. In 1993, he was awarded the Oregon State Bar Association's Award of Merit.

Additionally, Denecke was a trustee for both the Oregon Graduate Center (now part of OHSU) and Reed College in Portland. He also served as chairperson for the YMCA Youth & Government program, and served as an overseer to Lewis & Clark College.

Judicial career
In 1962, Arno Denecke was elected to the Oregon Supreme Court. He then served starting in 1963 until he resign from the bench on June 30, 1982. He was re-elected in 1968, 1974, and 1980. Denecke was selected as chief justice in 1976, and served in that capacity until he resigned in 1982. While on the bench he wrote many opinions including Seattle-First National Bank v. Oregon Pacific Industries, 262 Or. 578, 500 P.2d 1033 (1972) and Gustafson v. Payless, 269 Or. 354, 525 P.2d 118 (1974). As chief justice he was involved with reforms of the court that centralized many administrative tasks under that position.

Later years and family
After leaving the court he was an advocate for school reforms and led an investigation of Oregon's State Accident Insurance Fund. Denecke was married to Marguerite L. Gahr. He had two stepchildren, Michael Potter and Shirley Potter.  He had 3 children with longtime wife Selma. Arno Denecke died on October 20, 1993, in Salem, Oregon, at the age of 77. The Marion County Bar Association gives the Arno Denecke Award annually to attorneys for pro bono work.

Publications
 Author of, The Judiciary Needs Your Help Teachers, 22 J. LEGAL EDUC. 197, 203 (1969).

References

1916 births
1993 deaths
Oregon state court judges
United States Army personnel of World War II
University of Illinois College of Law alumni
University of Oregon faculty
Lewis & Clark College faculty
Willamette University faculty
Politicians from Salem, Oregon
Chief Justices of the Oregon Supreme Court
School board members in Oregon
Oregon Graduate Institute people
20th-century American lawyers
20th-century American judges
Lawyers from Salem, Oregon
United States Army colonels
Military personnel from Oregon
Justices of the Oregon Supreme Court